Lower Lusatia is a historical region in Central Europe, stretching from the southeast of the German state of Brandenburg to the southwest of Lubusz Voivodeship in Poland. Like adjacent Upper Lusatia in the south, Lower Lusatia is a settlement area of the West Slavic Sorbs whose endangered Lower Sorbian language is related to Upper Sorbian and Polish.

Geography

This sparsely inhabited area within the North European Plain (Northern Lowland) is characterised by extended pine forests, heathlands and meadows. In the north it is confined by the middle Spree River with Lake Schwielochsee and its eastern continuation across the Oder at Fürstenberg to Chlebowo. In the glacial valley between Lübben and Cottbus, the Spree River branches out into the Spreewald ("Spree Woods") riparian forest. Other rivers include the Berste and Oelse tributaries as well as the Schlaube and the Oder–Spree Canal opened in 1891.

In the east, the Bóbr River from Łagoda via Krzystkowice down to the historic town of Żary forms the border with the lands of Lower Silesia. In the west the course of the upper Dahme River down to Golßen separates it from the former Electoral Saxon lands of Saxe-Wittenberg. Between Lower and Upper Lusatia is a hill region called the Grenzwall (literally "border dike", although it is in fact a morainic ridge), the eastern continuation of the Fläming Heath. In the Middle Ages this area had dense forests, so it represented a major obstacle to civilian and military traffic. Today it is roughly congruent of the border between Brandenburg and the state of Saxony.

In the course of much of the 19th and the entire 20th century, Lower Lusatia was shaped by the lignite (brown coal) industry and extensive open-pit mining, by which more than 100 of the region's villages—many of them within the Sorbian settlement area—were damaged or destroyed, especially by order of East German authorities. While this process is still going on, most notably around Jänschwalde Power Station, run by EPH, some now exhausted open-pit mines are being converted into artificial lakes, in the hope of attracting tourism, and the area is now referred to as the Lusatian Lake District (Lausitzer Seenland).

Today the area comprises the Brandenburg districts of Oberspreewald-Lausitz and Spree-Neiße with the unitary authority of Cottbus, as well as parts of Elbe-Elster, Dahme-Spreewald, and Oder-Spree. Important towns beside Cottbus and the historic capitals Lübben and Luckau include Calau, Doberlug-Kirchhain, Finsterwalde, Forst, Guben/Gubin, Lauchhammer, Lübbenau, Senftenberg, Spremberg, Vetschau, and Żary in present-day Poland.

Since 1945, when a small part of Lusatia east of the Oder–Neisse line was incorporated into Poland, Żary has been touted as the capital of Polish Lusatia.

History
The area of Lower Lusatia roughly corresponds with the eastern March of Lusatia or Saxon Eastern March between the Saale and Bóbr rivers, which about 965 was severed from the vast Marca Geronis, conquered by the Saxon count Gero in the course of his campaigns against the Polabian Slavs from 939 onwards. Odo I became the first margrave; his successor Gero II from 1002 onwards had to face several attacks by Polish duke Bolesław I Chrobry, which did not end until the 1018 Treaty of Bautzen, which ceded large parts of eastern Lusatia to Poland. Emperor Conrad II reconquered the territories in 1031.

In 1136 Conrad the Great of the mighty House of Wettin, margrave of Meissen since 1123, also received the March of Lusatia. This remained under the rule of the Wettin dynasty until in 1303 it was acquired by the Ascanian margraves of Brandenburg. With Brandenburg the march was inherited by the House of Wittelsbach in 1320; in 1367 Elector Otto V sold it to Emperor Charles IV of Luxembourg who incorporated Lower Lusatia into the Bohemian Crown. Charles' father King John of Bohemia had already acquired the adjacent territory to the south around Bautzen and Görlitz, which became known as Upper Lusatia. The former Lordship of Cottbus was acquired by Brandenburg in 1455 and remained an exclave within the Bohemian kingdom.

Both Lusatias formed separate Bohemian crown lands under the rule of the Luxembourg, Jagiellon and—from 1526—Habsburg dynasties. In the course of the Reformation the vast majority of the population turned Protestant. The Bohemian era came to an end when Emperor Ferdinand II of Habsburg ceded the Lusatias to Elector John George I of Saxony under the 1635 Peace of Prague in return for his support in the Thirty Years' War; thus the lands returned to the House of Wettin. As the Kingdom of Saxony had sided with Napoleon it had to cede Lower Lusatia to Prussia in the 1815 Congress of Vienna, whereafter the territory became part of the Province of Brandenburg. With the implementation of the Oder–Neisse line by the 1945 Potsdam Conference, the lands east of the Neisse river fell to Poland, and the land's indigenous German population was expelled by the Communist Authorities.

Coat of arms

The Lower Lusatian bull is first documented in 1363. In 1378, upon the death of Emperor Charles IV, it appeared in gules on a field argent (red on silver), similar to the coat of arms of Luckau, in which the bull has gold horns and hooves, and turns his head to look at the viewer. After over 600 years it is still used today as Lower Lusatia's coat of arms.

Nature reserves and parks
Spreewald biosphere reserve
Lusatian Lake District
Lower Lusatian Heath Nature Park
Lower Lusatian Ridge Nature Park

See also
List of regions of Saxony

References

Geography of Lusatia
Historical regions in Germany
Regions of Brandenburg
Historical regions in Poland
Regions of Saxony
Former duchies of the Kingdom of Bohemia
Lands of the Bohemian Crown